Jorge Octavio Teillier Sandoval (24 June 1935 – 22 April 1996) was a Chilean poet.  He was born in  Lautaro, Chile and died in Viña del Mar.

References

Chilean male poets
1935 births
1996 deaths
20th-century Chilean poets
20th-century Chilean male writers
People from Lautaro